Khora Ramji Chawda (1860–1923), better known as Seth Khora Ramji, was a reputed railway contractor, coal mines owner, banker and philanthropist of the early 20th century in India, who worked from Dhanbad and Jharia.

Life-sketch
He was born in the year 1860 in a small village called Sinugra in Cutch and belonged to small but enterprising Mestri community. He was one of the reputed Railway Contractors of his times and his exploits were mentioned by British authorities. He is also credited by them to be the first Indian to break monopoly of Europeans in Jharia coalfields. He established his first Colliery name Khas Jharia Colliery in 1895 and moved on to establish five more by 1910. He was also a financing partner in many coalfields of Jharia coal belt and additionally worked as a Private Banker. With his half-brother, Jethabhai Lira Jethwa (1862-1932) he owned Khas Jinagora Colliery, which operated under name & style of J. & K. Ramji.

Railway Contract Works across British India
As per British records – a few lines are quoted – 

Some of the works done by Khora Ramji Chawda of Sinugra are : 1880 : Hubli Loco Shed & other Works, 100 Miles work in North Western Railway, 20 Miles Work in Southern Maratta Railway, 177 miles in 1882–84 Hotgi to Gadag with his brothers in SMR, 22 Miles Railway in East Bengal Railway, 1888 – 128 miles in Bilaspur to Jharsuguda with fellow Mistris section including Bridge over Hasdeo River at Champa in BNR, in 1894 Jharia Branch line of EIR, 1895 : Railway line in East Coast State Railway & Bridge over Ganjam. His last Railway work was in 1903 : Bridge over Ganges river in Allahbad – Lucknow section.

Shift in career from Contractor to Miner

While working for this bridge, he was harassed by Engineer I.L. Gail, so he decided to stop Railway Contracts.  By this time since 1895 to 1901 he had already started two collieries in Jharia. A. B. Gale later realised his mistake and offered him contracts in other section. But Khora Ramji declined the offer and diverted all his energy to Coal Mining business, in which he was assisted by his & his brother's son. He also started a new venture as a private banker at Jharia. He rose to such a height by 1920 and became Seth Khora Ramji from Khora Ramji that British had to mention his name in Encyclopaedia of Bengal, Bihar & Orissa. He had studied up to fourth standard in his native village school but still managed to erect & build Railway bridges requiring deep technical knowledge and mathematical calculations.

Coal Mines at Jharia coalfields belt
Khora Ramji and Brothers established collieries at Khas Jharia, Jeenagora, Jamadoba, Balihari, Fatehpur, Gareria, Bansjora & Bagadih.  In Pure Jharia Colliery Khora Ramji and brothers were partners with Diwan Bahadur D.D. Thacker. Khora Ramji was also partner in Khimji Walji & Company's Indian Jharia Colliery located at Tisra.

The credit of being first Indian to break the monopoly of British in Jharia Coalfields goes to Seth Khora Ramji of Sinugra. In the life sketch of Khora Ramji given in Encyclopedia of Bengal, Bihar & Orissa – the British have noted this fact in year 1920 – "In Jharia Coalfield he was first Indian to seize the opportunity and by his prompt entry into colliery business, he was able to remove the stigma that would otherwise be levelled against his community as backward class." Further, details are given in the book Diary of Golden Days at Jharia – A Memoir & History of Gurjar Kashtriya Samaj of Kutch in Coalfields of Jharia – written by Natwarlal Devram Jethwa -Quote:  He similarly purchased about eight coal-fields from years 1895–1909. Further, he also encouraged fellow Mistri contractors to purchase the land and even financed them to do so. He later approached Raja of Jharia for lease of mining rights and laid foundation of his colliery business. The location of his three collieries named Jeenagora, Khas Jherria, Gareria is mentioned also in 1917 Gazetteers of Bengal, Assam, Bihar & Orissa.:- Unquote As per details given in Diary of Golden Days at Jharia – A Memoir & History of Gurjar Kashtriya Samaj of Kutch in Coalfields of Jharia – written by Natwarlal Devram Jethwa – Quote: "Seth Khora Ramji headed the first association as mentioned by British authorities in Encyclopaedia Bengal, Bihar & Orissa (1920).

Shipping Business at Cutch State
Seth Khora Ramji and brothers also owned a fleet of ships based in Cutch State, which used to deal in import and export dry fruits and spices, trading from Tuna Port and Mandvi with Muscat, Mombasa, Mzizima, Zanzibar and other countries. Among others from his community, who were in this business were Seth Raja Narayan Chawda of Kumbharia, Kalaji Kachrani Varu of Anjar in decades of 1890–1920. After death of Khora Ramji, one of grandson, Jivram Jeram carried on shipping business for couple of decades till 1945.

Death

Khora Ramji died in year 1923 at his native place in Sinugra.

Philanthropic activities
As a philanthropist, in his native village Sinugra, he had built and donated in year 1910 a Hindu temple, wells, welcome-gate, Chabutro and a primary school, which is now named Seth Khora Ramji Prathmik Shala. He also donated major fund along with some other Mistri colliery owners to start a Gujarati school named the Jharia Anglo-Gujarati School at Jharia in 1905. He also owned more than 500 acres farm-lands, the produce of which was given away to poor and needy. In the year 1920, when he held a large public charity event and a yagna at Sinugra. At the time of this event, Seth Khora Ramji was honoured by Maharao of Cutch, Sir Khengarji III Sawai Bahadur, who sent him a Paghdi by hands of royal messenger. Further, at Mathura he along with Jetha Lira Jethwa of Sinugra had built and donated a Dharamashala now named Kutch Kadia Dharamshala in the years 1889–1900, when they were stationed there for railway contract job.

Successors

The several mines owned jointly by family of 5 brothers, we divivded amongst the family mutually after his death. Ambalal Khora also carried on father's legacy as a railway contractor, who died in a railway accident.

Capcize & Fire in main mines

His eldest son Karamshi Khora took over the management of Khas Jharia & Golden Jharia mines. Karamshi Khora was among the dignitaries, who shared dais in historic All India Trade Union Congress meeting held at Jharia in 1928 by prominent labor leaders like Swami Viswananda and Swami Darsanananda. It was hosted by Ramjush Agarwalla and other noted coal miners present with Karamshi Khora were D. D. Thacker, Chhaganlal Karamshi Parekh, Babu Shyam Sunder Chakravarty, Keshavji Pitambar, Madhavji Jivan, Devram Jethabhai and others.

Several after his death two of his collieries, Khas Jharia & Golden Jharia, which worked on maximum 260-foot-deep shafts, collapsed due to now infamous underground fires, in which their house & bungalow also collapsed on 8 November 1930, causing 18 feet subsidence and widespread destruction. The coal mines at that time were run by his sons Karamshi Khora, Ambalal Khora and others.

New Ventures
Jivram Jeram, who carried on his legacy of Shipping business in Cutch till in 1945 he came to Calcutta in year 1946. He, Devram Jethabhai & others invested in fresh coal mines business. Jivram Jeram  was one of the founders and director of Khas Shampore Coal Company founded in 1946 having head office at Calcutta and mines at Mohuda near Jharia. It was a joint venture in which other partners were the family of Nagalpar based Dhanaji Ratanji Rathor, who owned the Diamond Coal Coampany of Tisra, Jayantilal Ojha from the noted industrialist and miner concern of Amritlal Ojha, R. K. Seth the transport magnate of East India and noted industrialist and politician of Lahore, Rai Bahadur Lala Ram Saran Das. Jivram Jeram later also purchased minerals mines of quartz, kayonit and stones at Saraikela.

Jetha Lira died in 1932 and he Khas Jeenagora mine was later on run solely his son Devram Jethabhai Jethwa till 1938–39 after which the mine was sold due to dispute with Raja of Jharia over lease renewal. The family moved to Calcutta and established themselves as one of the largest importers and stockists of coal mining machinery and heavy duty screw pumps.

Nationalization of Coal Mines in 1971

The business of some other coal mines in Jharia of Seth Khora Ramji were carried on by his successors, which were finally taken over by government when the coal mines in India were nationalized in 1971–72.

See also

Jagmal Raja Chauhan

References 

People from Kutch district
People from Dhanbad
Indian people in rail transport
1923 deaths
Indian bankers
1860 births
Founders of Indian schools and colleges
Indian philanthropists
Indian businesspeople in coal
Indian businesspeople in mining
Gujarati people
People from Jharia